Alaska state elections in 2020 were held on Tuesday, November 3, 2020. Aside from its party-run Democratic presidential primary held on April 10 (not including the Republican Party presidential primary which was cancelled by the state party), its primary elections were held on August 18, 2020.

In addition to the U.S. presidential race, Alaska voters elected the Class II U.S. Senator from Alaska, its at-large seat to the House of Representatives, 1 of 5 seats on the Alaska Supreme Court, 1 of 3 seats on the Alaska Court of Appeals, all of the seats of the Alaska House of Representatives, and 11 of 20 seats in the Alaska Senate. There were also two ballot measures which were voted on.

To vote by mail, registered Alaska voters had to request a ballot by October 24, 2020.

Federal offices

President of the United States

Alaska has 3 electoral votes in the Electoral College.

United States Class II Senate Seat

United States House of Representatives

State offices

State judiciary
Incumbent Susan M. Carney was reelected for a 10-year term in the state Supreme Court. She was appointed by Governor Bill Walker.

Incumbent Tracey Wollenberg was also reelected for her seat in the state Court of Appeals. She was appointed by Bill Walker.

State legislature
All 40 seats of the Alaska House of Representatives and 11 of 20 seats of the Alaska Senate were up for election. The outcome of this election could affect partisan balance during post-census congressional redistricting.

State senate

Before the election the composition of the Alaska Senate was:

The composition of the Alaska Senate remained the same after the election. Two Republicans lost reelection.

House of Representatives

Before the election the composition of the Alaska State House was:

After the election the composition of the Alaska State House was:

Ballot measures

Measure 1
The North Slope Oil Production Tax Increase Initiative would increase taxation on production of oil in the North Slope in fields which have already produced at least 400 million barrels of oil and produced at least 40,000 barrels in the last year.

Polling

Results

Measure 2

The Top-Four Ranked-Choice Voting and Campaign Finance Laws Initiative, would mandate the following changes to the state's election policies: increasing disclosure requirements for "dark money" political contributions of greater than $2000 which themselves are derived from donations to the donors, replacing all partisan primaries with one open primary ballot (and allowing the top four vote-getters to proceed to the general election) and implementing ranked-choice voting in all general elections.

Polling

Results

See also
 Bilingual elections requirement for Alaska (per Voting Rights Act Amendments of 2006)

Notes

Partisan clients

References

External links